Plastin is a family of actin-bundling proteins, which are found in many lifeforms, from humans and other animals to plants and yeasts.

Members include:

 LCP1
 PLS1
 PLS3

References 

EF-hand-containing proteins
Protein families
Human proteins